Group A of the 1994 Federation Cup Americas Zone was one of four pools in the Americas zone of the 1994 Federation Cup. Four teams competed in a round robin competition, with the top three teams advancing to the knockout stage.

Paraguay vs. Costa Rica

Peru vs. El Salvador

Paraguay vs. El Salvador

Peru vs. Costa Rica

Paraguay vs. Peru

Costa Rica vs. El Salvador

See also
Fed Cup structure

References

External links
 Fed Cup website

1994 Federation Cup Americas Zone